Clinical handover, patient handover or handover is the transfer of professional responsibility and accountability for some or all aspects of care for a patient, or group of patients, to another person or professional group on a temporary or permanent basis. Failure in handover is a major source in preventable patient harm. Clinical handover is an international concern and Australia and the United Kingdom have reviewed this  and developed risk reduction recommendations. Some strategies to improve handover include bedside handover, using SBAR and using computerised handover sheets

See also 

Change-of-shift report (nursing)

References

Patient safety